Robert and Bertram is a 1939 German musical comedy film directed by Hans H. Zerlett and starring Rudi Godden, Kurt Seifert, and Carla Rust. It premiered in Hamburg on 7 July 1939. It was based on the 1856 play Robert and Bertram by Gustav Räder about two wandering vagrants which had been adapted into several film versions including a Polish film of the same title the previous year. It was set in 1839.

It  was made by Tobis Film at the company's Johannisthal Studios in Berlin. The film's sets were designed by the art directors Karl Machus and Erich Zander.

It was the only anti-semitic musical comedy released during the Nazi era and the first film since Kristallnacht to focus on Jews as cultural and economic outsiders. In fact the antagonist of this film itself, the Jew Nathan Ipelmeyer is not a cultural and economic outsider, but a very wealthy "Kommerzienrat" (cf. Geheimrat).

Cast

References

Bibliography

External links

1939 films
Films of Nazi Germany
1930s historical comedy films
1939 musical comedy films
German historical comedy films
German musical comedy films
1930s German-language films
Films directed by Hans H. Zerlett
German films based on plays
Films set in the 19th century
Films set in the 1830s
Nazi antisemitic propaganda films
Tobis Film films
Films shot at Johannisthal Studios
German black-and-white films
1930s historical musical films
German historical musical films
1930s German films